Burramine is a locality in the local government area of the Shire of Moira in Australia.
 
Burramine post office opened on 24 July 1876, closed on 1 July 1895, reopened on 13 August 1900 and was closed on 3 January 1908.

Burramine East post office opened on 1 April 1882, closed on 1 July 1895, reopened in 1902 and was closed on 31 March 1923.
 
Burramine North State School post office opened on 6 January 1913 and was closed on 31 March 1914.

Burramine West post office is located in the suburb of Boosey and is not in the locality of Burramine.

References

Towns in Victoria (Australia)
Shire of Moira